Auranga River is a river in western India in Gujarat whose origin is Near Bhervi village. Its basin has a maximum length of 97 km.

References

Rivers of Gujarat
Rivers of India